Rahamim Malul (born 29 April 1946) is an Israeli politician who served as a member of the Knesset for Shas between 1999 and 2003, and is the current mayor of Rehovot.

Biography
Born in Morocco, Malul made aliyah to Israel in 1960. He studied at a teachers' college, and worked as a teacher and administrator.

He was elected onto Rehovot city council, where he served three terms. In August 1996 he was appointed head of the local council of the Bedouin city of Kuseife by the Ministry of Internal Affairs.

In the 1999 elections Malul was placed 12th on the Shas list, and entered the Knesset when the party won 17 seats. He lost his seat in the 2003 elections

He became mayor of Rehovot in 2009 after the resignation of Shuki Forer.

References

External links

1946 births
20th-century Moroccan Jews
Moroccan emigrants to Israel
Israeli educators
Mayors of local councils in Israel
Mayors of places in Israel
People from Rehovot
Living people
Shas politicians
Members of the 15th Knesset (1999–2003)